Agoraphobia is a mental and behavioral disorder, specifically an anxiety disorder characterized by symptoms of anxiety in situations where the person perceives their environment to be unsafe with no easy way to escape. These situations can include open spaces, public transit, shopping centers, crowds and queues, or simply being outside their home on their own. Being in these situations may result in a panic attack. Those affected will go to great lengths to avoid these situations. In severe cases, people may become completely unable to leave their homes.

Agoraphobia is believed to be due to a combination of genetic and environmental factors. The condition often runs in families, and stressful or traumatic events such as the death of a parent or being attacked may be a trigger. In the DSM-5 agoraphobia is classified as a phobia along with specific phobias and social phobia. Other conditions that can produce similar symptoms include separation anxiety, post-traumatic stress disorder, and major depressive disorder. The diagnosis of agoraphobia has been shown to be comorbid with depression, substance abuse, and suicide ideation.

Without treatment it is uncommon for agoraphobia to resolve. Treatment is typically with a type of counselling called cognitive behavioral therapy (CBT). CBT results in resolution for about half of people. In some instances, those with a diagnosis of agoraphobia have reported taking benzodiazepines and antipsychotics augmentation. Agoraphobia affects about 1.7% of adults. Women are affected about twice as often as men. The condition is rare in children, often begins in early adulthood, and becomes less common in old age.

Etymology 
The term "agoraphobia" was coined in German in 1871 by pioneering German psychologist Karl Friedrich Otto Westphal, 1833–1890, in his article "Die Agoraphobie, eine neuropathische Erscheinung." Archiv für Psychiatrie und Nervenkrankheiten, Berlin, 1871–72; 3: 138–161.

Signs and symptoms 
Agoraphobia is a condition where individuals become anxious in unfamiliar environments or where they perceive that they have little control. Triggers for this anxiety may include wide-open spaces, crowds (social anxiety), or traveling (even short distances). Agoraphobia is often, but not always, compounded by a fear of social embarrassment, as the agoraphobic fears the onset of a panic attack and appearing distraught in public. Most of the time they avoid these areas and stay in the comfort of their haven, usually their home.

Agoraphobia is also defined as "a fear, sometimes terrifying, by those who have experienced one or more panic attacks". In these cases, the patient is fearful of a particular place because they have experienced a panic attack at the same location at a previous time. Fearing the onset of another panic attack, the patient is fearful or even avoids a location. Some refuse to leave their homes even in medical emergencies because the fear of being outside of their comfort areas is too great.

The person with this condition can sometimes go to great lengths to avoid the locations where they have experienced the onset of a panic attack. Agoraphobia, as described in this manner, is actually a symptom professionals check when making a diagnosis of panic disorder. Other syndromes like obsessive compulsive disorder or post-traumatic stress disorder can also cause agoraphobia. Essentially, any irrational fear that keeps one from going outside can cause the syndrome.

People with agoraphobia may experience temporary separation anxiety disorder when certain other individuals of the household depart from the residence temporarily, such as a parent or spouse, or when they are left home alone.  Such temporary conditions can result in an increase in anxiety or a panic attack or feeling the need to separate themselves from family or maybe friends.

People with agoraphobia sometimes fear waiting outside for long periods of time; that symptom can be called "macrophobia".

Panic attacks 
Agoraphobia patients can experience sudden panic attacks when traveling to places where they fear they are out of control, help would be difficult to obtain, or they could be embarrassed. During a panic attack, epinephrine is released in large amounts, triggering the body's natural fight-or-flight response. A panic attack typically has an abrupt onset, building to maximum intensity within 10 to 15 minutes, and rarely lasts longer than 30 minutes.  Symptoms of a panic attack include palpitations, rapid heartbeat, sweating, trembling, nausea, vomiting, dizziness, tightness in the throat, and shortness of breath. Many patients report a fear of dying, fear of losing control of emotions, or fear of losing control of behaviors.

Causes 
Agoraphobia is believed to be due to a combination of genetic and environmental factors. The condition often runs in families, and stressful or traumatic events such as the death of a parent or being attacked may be a trigger.

Research has uncovered a link between agoraphobia and difficulties with spatial orientation. Individuals without agoraphobia are able to maintain balance by combining information from their vestibular system, their visual system, and their proprioceptive sense.  A disproportionate number of agoraphobics have weak vestibular function and consequently rely more on visual or tactile signals.  They may become disoriented when visual cues are sparse (as in wide-open spaces) or overwhelming (as in crowds). Likewise, they may be confused by sloping or irregular surfaces. In a virtual reality study, agoraphobics showed impaired processing of changing audiovisual data in comparison with subjects without agoraphobia.

Substance-induced 
Chronic use of tranquilizers and sleeping pills such as benzodiazepines has been linked to onset of agoraphobia. In 10 patients who had developed agoraphobia during benzodiazepine dependence, symptoms abated within the first year of assisted withdrawal. Similarly, alcohol use disorders are associated with panic with or without agoraphobia; this association may be due to the long-term effects of alcohol consumption causing a distortion in brain chemistry. Tobacco smoking has also been associated with the development and emergence of agoraphobia, often with panic disorder; it is uncertain how tobacco smoking results in anxiety-panic with or without agoraphobia symptoms, but the direct effects of nicotine dependence or the effects of tobacco smoke on breathing have been suggested as possible causes. Self-medication or a combination of factors may also explain the association between tobacco smoking and agoraphobia and panic.

Attachment theory 

Some scholars have explained agoraphobia as an attachment deficit, i.e., the temporary loss of the ability to tolerate spatial separations from a secure base. Recent empirical research has also linked attachment and spatial theories of agoraphobia.

Spatial theory 
In the social sciences, a perceived clinical bias exists in agoraphobia research. Branches of the social sciences, especially geography, have increasingly become interested in what may be thought of as a spatial phenomenon. One such approach links the development of agoraphobia with modernity. Factors considered contributing to agoraphobia within modernity are the ubiquity of cars and urbanization. These have helped develop the expansion of public space and the contraction of private space, thus creating in the minds of agoraphobia-prone people a tense, unbridgeable gulf between the two.

Evolutionary psychology 
An evolutionary psychology view is that the more unusual primary agoraphobia without panic attacks may be due to a different mechanism from agoraphobia with panic attacks. Primary agoraphobia without panic attacks may be a specific phobia explained by it once having been evolutionarily advantageous to avoid exposed, large, open spaces without cover or concealment. Agoraphobia with panic attacks may be an avoidance response secondary to the panic attacks, due to fear of the situations in which the panic attacks occurred.

Diagnosis 
Most people who present to mental health specialists develop agoraphobia after the onset of panic disorder. Agoraphobia is best understood as an adverse behavioral outcome of repeated panic attacks and subsequent anxiety and preoccupation with these attacks that leads to an avoidance of situations where a panic attack could occur. Early treatment of panic disorder can often prevent agoraphobia. Agoraphobia is typically determined when symptoms are worse than panic disorder, but also do not meet the criteria for other anxiety disorders such as depression.

Agoraphobia without history of panic disorder 
Agoraphobia without a history of panic disorder (also called primary agoraphobia) is an anxiety disorder where the individual with the diagnosis does not meet the DSM-5 criteria for panic disorder. Agoraphobia typically develops as a result of having panic disorder. In a small minority of cases, however, agoraphobia can develop by itself without being triggered by the onset of panic attacks. Agoraphobia can be caused by traumatic experiences, such as bullying or abuse. Historically, there has been debate over whether agoraphobia without panic genuinely existed, or whether it was simply a manifestation of other disorders such as panic disorder, general anxiety disorder, avoidant personality disorder and social phobia. One researcher said: "out of 41 agoraphobics seen (at a clinic) during a period of 1 year, only 1 fit the diagnosis of agoraphobia without panic attacks, and even this particular classification was questionable...Do not expect to see too many agoraphobics without panic". In spite of this earlier skepticism, current thinking is that agoraphobia without panic disorder is indeed a valid, unique illness which has gone largely unnoticed, since those with the condition are far less likely to seek clinical treatment.

According to the DSM-IV-TR, a widely used manual for diagnosing mental disorders, the condition is diagnosed when agoraphobia is present without panic disorder where symptoms are not caused by or are unreasonable to an underlying medical problem or pharmacological influence.

Treatments

Therapy 
Systematic desensitization can provide lasting relief to the majority of patients with panic disorder and agoraphobia.  The disappearance of residual and sub-clinical agoraphobic avoidance, and not simply of panic attacks, should be the aim of exposure therapy. Many patients can deal with exposure easier if they are in the company of a friend on whom they can rely. Patients must remain in the situation until anxiety has abated because if they leave the situation, the phobic response will not decrease and it may even rise.

A related exposure treatment is  exposure, a cognitive behavioral therapy method, that gradually exposes patients to the feared situations or objects. This treatment was largely effective with an effect size from d = 0.78 to d = 1.34, and these effects were shown to increase over time, proving that the treatment had long-term efficacy (up to 12 months after treatment).

Psychological interventions in combination with pharmaceutical treatments were overall more effective than treatments simply involving either CBT or pharmaceuticals. Further research showed there was no significant effect between using group CBT versus individual CBT.

Cognitive restructuring has also proved useful in treating agoraphobia. This treatment involves coaching a participant through a dianoetic discussion, with the intent of replacing irrational, counterproductive beliefs with more factual and beneficial ones.

Relaxation techniques are often useful skills for the agoraphobic to develop, as they can be used to stop or prevent symptoms of anxiety and panic.

Videoconferencing psychotherapy (VCP) is an emerging modality used to treat various disorders in a remote method. Similar to traditional face-to-face interventions, VCP can be used to administer CBT. The use of VCP has been shown to be equally effective as face-to-face interventions at treating panic disorder and agoraphobia (PDA) and motivating the client to continue treatment.

Medications 
Antidepressant medications most commonly used to treat anxiety disorders are mainly selective serotonin reuptake inhibitors. Benzodiazepines, monoamine oxidase inhibitor, and tricyclic antidepressants are also sometimes prescribed for treatment of agoraphobia. Antidepressants are important because some have anxiolytic effects. Antidepressants should be used in conjunction with exposure as a form of self-help or with cognitive behaviour therapy. A combination of medication and cognitive behaviour therapy is sometimes the most effective treatment for agoraphobia.

Benzodiazepines and other anxiolytic medications such as alprazolam and clonazepam are used to treat anxiety and can also help control the symptoms of a panic attack.

Alternative medicine 
Eye movement desensitization and reprocessing (EMDR) has been studied as a possible treatment for agoraphobia, with poor results. As such, EMDR is only recommended in cases where cognitive-behavioral approaches have proven ineffective or in cases where agoraphobia has developed following trauma.

Many people with anxiety disorders benefit from joining a self-help or support group (telephone conference-call support groups or online support groups being of particular help for completely housebound individuals). Sharing problems and achievements with others, as well as sharing various self-help tools, are common activities in these groups. In particular, stress management techniques and various kinds of meditation practices and visualization techniques can help people with anxiety disorders calm themselves and may enhance the effects of therapy, as can service to others, which can distract from the self-absorption that tends to go with anxiety problems. Also, preliminary evidence suggests aerobic exercise may have a calming effect. Since caffeine, certain illicit drugs, and even some over-the-counter cold medications can aggravate the symptoms of anxiety disorders, they should be avoided.

Epidemiology 
Agoraphobia occurs about twice as commonly among women as it does in men.

Panic disorder with or without agoraphobia affects roughly 5.1% of Americans, and about 1/3 of this population with panic disorder have co-morbid agoraphobia. It is uncommon to have agoraphobia without panic attacks, with only 0.17% of people with agoraphobia not presenting panic disorders as well.

Society and culture

Notable cases 

 Woody Allen (b. 1935), American actor, director, musician
 Kim Basinger (b. 1953), American actress
 Earl Campbell (b. 1955), American pro football player
 Macaulay Culkin (b. 1980), American actor, known for his portrayal of Kevin McCallister in Home Alone and Home Alone 2: Lost in New York, said he had "self-diagnosed" agoraphobia.
 Paula Deen (b. 1947), American chef, author, and television personality
 H.L. Gold (1914–1996), science fiction editor – as a result of trauma during his wartime experiences, his agoraphobia became so severe that for more than two decades he was unable to leave his apartment. Towards the end of his life, he acquired some control over the condition.
 Daryl Hannah (b. 1960), American actress
 Howard Hughes (1905–1976), American aviator, industrialist, film producer and philanthropist
 Olivia Hussey (b. 1951), Anglo-Argentine actress
 Shirley Jackson (1916–1965), American writer – her agoraphobia is considered to be a primary inspiration for the novel We Have Always Lived in the Castle.
 Elfriede Jelinek (b. 1946), Austrian writer, Nobel Prize laureate in Literature in 2004
 Mike Patton (b. 1968), American musician.
 Bolesław Prus (1847–1912), Polish journalist and novelist
 Peter Robinson (b. 1962), British musician known as Marilyn
 Brian Wilson (b. 1942), American singer and songwriter, primary songwriter of The Beach Boys, a former recluse and agoraphobic who has schizophrenia
 Ben Weasel, singer and songwriter

See also 

 Hikikomori
 List of phobias
 Phobia

References

Further reading 
Agoraphobia Without a History or Panic Disorder May Be Part of the Panic Disorder Syndrome. Journal of Nervous & Mental Disease, 190(9):624-630, September 2002.
The Relationship of Agoraphobia and Panic in a Community Sample of Adolescents and Young Adults.

External links 

 
Anxiety Disorders Association of America Information for families, clinicians & researchers
Anxiety Disorders Association of Canada Registered Canadian non-profit organization, promotes prevention, treatment & management of anxiety disorders
ANXIETY UK (Formerly the National Phobics Society) Nationally registered charity in the UK; provides information, support & understanding
The Phobic Trust (Of New Zealand) Registered charitable trust in New Zealand; provides information about treatment, education & support to people with anxiety disorders
South African Depression and Anxiety group (National Charity) Counseling, mental health awareness programs: media & public speaking outreach & rural outreach initiatives
 
 Self help guide (NHS Direct)

 
Phobias
Wikipedia neurology articles ready to translate
Wikipedia medicine articles ready to translate